Douglas Felisbino de Oliveira (born 16 January 1995), commonly known as Douglas Oliveira, is a Brazilian professional footballer who plays as a forward for J3 League club Iwate Grulla Morioka, on loan from Hokkaido Consadole Sapporo.

References

External links
 

Profile at Hokkaido Consadole Sapporo

1995 births
Living people
Brazilian footballers
Brazilian expatriate footballers
Association football forwards
Coritiba Foot Ball Club players
Maringá Futebol Clube players
Rio Branco Sport Club players
Esporte Clube Pelotas players
Concórdia Atlético Clube players
Associação Desportiva Itaboraí players
Goytacaz Futebol Clube players
Clube Náutico Marcílio Dias players
Luverdense Esporte Clube players
Hokkaido Consadole Sapporo players
Iwate Grulla Morioka players
Campeonato Brasileiro Série A players
Campeonato Brasileiro Série C players
J1 League players
J3 League players
Brazilian expatriate sportspeople in Japan
Expatriate footballers in Japan
Footballers from Porto Alegre